Stellastarr is the self-titled debut album by American indie rock band Stellastarr. It was released on September 23, 2003.

The track "My Coco" appeared on the video game MVP Baseball 2004 and also on the opening credits from the 2011 movie Enter Nowhere (also known as The Haunting of Black Wood), and on the closing credits of the season 2 finale of the Netflix series Special in 2021. "Jenny" appeared on Tony Hawk's Downhill Jam. "Homeland" appeared on NHL 2K8.

Track listing
 "In the Walls" – 3:49
 "Jenny" – 4:16
 "A Million Reasons" – 4:19
 "My Coco" – 5:05
 "No Weather" – 3:15
 "Moongirl" – 5:30
 "Somewhere Across Forever" – 3:40
 "Homeland" – 3:55
 "Untitled" – 5:07
 "Pulp Song" – 3:39

References

2003 debut albums
Stellastarr albums
RCA Records albums